Manidharil Manikkam is a 1973 Indian Tamil-language film, directed by C. V. Rajendran. The film stars Sivaji Ganesan, Prameela and A. V. M. Rajan. It was released on 7 December 1973.

Plot

Cast 
Sivaji Ganesan as Dr. Ananth
A. V. M. Rajan as Boopathy
Prameela as Ponni
Major Sundarrajan as Police Officer
M. N. Rajam
R. S. Manohar as Rathnam
Cho
Manorama as Rukmani
Suruli Rajan as Constable
Pattom Sadan

Production 
Ganesan's character was inspired by a Conjunctivitis specialist in Madras (later renamed Chennai).

Soundtrack 
The music was composed by M. S. Viswanathan, while lyrics were written by Kannadasan and Vaali.

Reception 
Kanthan of Kalki criticised the cinematography, but praised the makers for taking an ordinary story and stretching it to produce good results.

References

External links 
 

1970s Tamil-language films
1973 films
Films directed by C. V. Rajendran
Films scored by M. S. Viswanathan